Shatter'd is a song recorded by American singer Tynisha Keli, released as the second single from Keli's debut studio album The Chronicles of TK (2009). The song was written by Joacim Persson, Niclas Molinder, Johan Alkenas, Drew Ryan Scott, C. Coe and Sean Alexander. The world premiere of the single was released through iTunes Japan, March 4, 2009.  It debuted on Japan's Hot 100 Singles  at #16. The song's chorus repeats the phrase "you broke it you bought it".

Track listing

Premium Edition (CD)

Music video

The video was shot in Japan by director Mutou Makoto. The video consists of beauty shots and special lighting.

Charts

References

2009 singles
Tynisha Keli songs
Songs written by Sean Alexander
2009 songs
Songs written by Niclas Molinder
Songs written by Joacim Persson
Song recordings produced by Twin (production team)
Warner Records singles
Songs written by Drew Ryan Scott